The Visitor, published in 1996 and written by K. A. Applegate, is the second book in the Animorphs series. It is narrated by Rachel.

Plot summary
The Animorphs convene and decide that they need to make their next move against the Yeerks. The only lead they have is that Hedrick Chapman, the assistant principal at their school, is a Yeerk Controller. Jake asks Rachel to try to get to him through his daughter Melissa, an old friend of hers.  However, Melissa has become distant lately, and Rachel fears she has become a Controller like her father. Rachel remembers Melissa's pet cat Fluffer McKitty, and the Animorphs plan to infiltrate Chapman's house to find out what they can; Rachel morphs Melissa's pet cat to gain access, after a harrowing experience morphing a shrew to lure the cat out of a tree.

Once in the house, Rachel follows Mr. Chapman into a basement room and discovers that he communicates directly with Visser Three, the leader of the Earth invasion, through holographic technology. While in the room, she is spotted by Visser Three, who orders Chapman to kill her because she might be an Andalite. Rachel does not react, and Chapman reasons with Visser Three to allow Rachel to escape shaken, but unharmed. Before she leaves the house, Rachel follows Melissa and learns that she is not a Controller, but has pulled away from her friends because she believes her parents, who are now both Controllers, do not love her anymore.

Rachel decides to keep the encounter with Visser Three a secret from her friends, and convinces them that she needs to infiltrate Chapman's house again. She does a few nights later, this time with Jake stowed away on her back as a flea, unbeknownst to Rachel. She is careful to stay out of Chapman's and Visser Three's sights, but is again discovered. Visser Three is sure now that she is an Andalite bandit, and orders Chapman to bring Rachel to him. He also tells Chapman to bring Melissa so that she can be infested, because she is a security risk to the Yeerks; it was her cat that the "Andalite" used. Chapman rebels against his Yeerk, Iniss 226, causing Iniss to momentarily lose control of the host body and fight to take it back. Iniss is tired by the effort and opts not to take Melissa, planning to explain the circumstances face to face with the Visser.

Iniss takes Rachel and Jake, still morphed as a flea, to the abandoned construction site where the Animorphs first met the alien Elfangor, and he allows Chapman himself to speak to Visser Three. Chapman reminds the Visser that he willingly became a Controller on the condition that the Yeerks not take Melissa, and if they were to violate that contract, he would make life as hard as he could for the Yeerk in his head. Since Chapman is in a position of some influence at the school and is regularly meeting with parents, this would be very disastrous, and Visser Three grudgingly gives in. The other Animorphs show up to rescue Jake and Rachel and barely escape from one of Visser Three's monstrous morphs. The next day, Rachel writes an anonymous note to Melissa, telling her that her father loves her more than ever, despite not being able to show it.

Morphs

Re-release
Scholastic released The Visitor on May 1, 2011 with a new lenticular cover and updated pop-cultural references.

References

External links
Official page at Scholastic.com

Animorphs books
1996 science fiction novels
1996 American novels
2021 graphic novels
Scholastic Corporation books